Also known as Jirōzaemon (次郎左右衛門). Head of the Nōmi-Matsudaira (能見 松平), a branch of the main Matsudaira house which later became the Tokugawa shogunal family. Shigeyoshi served three successive generations of the main Matsudaira line: Kiyoyasu, Hirotada, and (Tokugawa) Ieyasu. Served as Okazaki-sōbugyō (Okazaki Magistrate) with Torii Tadayoshi, father of the famous Torii Mototada. Shigeyoshi's 4th son Matsudaira Shigekatsu went on to be the daimyō of Tōtōmi-Yokosuka (26,000 koku).

References
 Rekishi Dokuhon, January 2006 issue "Tokugawa Shōgun-ke to Matsudaira Ichizoku"

1493 births
1580 deaths
Samurai
Tokugawa clan